Altra Federal Credit Union Stadium, also known as Maxwell Field, is a stadium at Winona State University in Winona, Minnesota.  It has been the home to Winona State Warriors football team since at least the 1937 season, and the women's soccer team since 1995.  It was named Maxwell Field in honor of then-current Winona State president Guy Maxwell. Maxwell Hall, formerly the Maxwell Library, was also named in his honor.

Verizon Wireless Stadium
On August 5, 2004, Winona State University and Midwest Wireless entered into a ten-year agreement making the name of the football stadium Maxwell Field at Midwest Wireless Stadium.  The agreement called for Midwest Wireless to donate $250,000 to the Winona State University Athletic Department.

The donation made it possible to build a new press box which eight skyboxes, coaches’ offices, meeting rooms, classrooms and locker rooms, as well as room for print, radio and television media outlets.

Maxwell Field was the first on-campus college athletic facility in Minnesota with a corporate sponsor.  It was followed in 2009 with the University of Minnesota Golden Gophers' TCF Bank Stadium and fellow conference member Concordia University, Saint Paul's Sea Foam Stadium.

On July 10, 2007, Winona State's Athletic Director Larry Holstad said that due to Alltel Wireless' purchase of Midwest Wireless, the stadium would be renamed.

Due to Verizon Wireless' acquisition of Alltel, Alltel Stadium became known as Verizon Wireless Stadium, the third wireless carrier to have sponsorship of Maxwell Field.

In August 2014, without fanfare, the stadium's name was changed, dropping corporate sponsorship at the completion of the ten year sponsorship.

Altra Federal Credit Union Stadium

In September 2015, WSU entered a new partnership with Altra Federal Credit Union, renaming the stadium 'Altra Federal Credit Union Stadium.'

References

External links
Stadium Announcement

College football venues
Winona State Warriors football
Verizon Communications
Sports venues in Minnesota
Buildings and structures in Winona, Minnesota